USCGC Richard Dixon is the United States Coast Guard's thirteenth  cutter, commissioned in Tampa, Florida, on June 20, 2015.
She arrived in her home port of San Juan, Puerto Rico on June 24, 2015.

Operational career
On September 20, 2015, Richard Dixon intercepted a "go fast" smuggling boat, near the Dominican Republic, intercepting 41 bales of marijuana the smugglers had tried to scuttle, overboard, prior to their captures.

On March 9, 2016, air elements of the U.S. Customs and Border Protection agency requested Richard Dixon intercept a vessel with 25 refugees from the Dominican Republic. The Coast Guard subjects every refugee to a biometric recording, enabling them to recognize them if they make subsequent attempts to reach the United States. One individual was transferred to the U.S. for possible prosecution, while the other 24 were repatriated.

On April 2, 2016, Richard Dixon intercepted another small vessel from the Dominican Republic, carrying 20 refugees.  Fourteen of the refugees were transferred to a Dominican naval vessel. Three of the remaining refugees were taken to the United States, for prosecution, because this was not their first attempt to enter the United States. The other three refugees were not Dominicans; they were believed to be from India. They were taken to the U.S. to be repatriated to later.

On April 25, 2018, Coast Guard watchstanders in Sector San Juan diverted Richard Dixon to intercept a suspected vessel while Customs and Border Protection Caribbean Air and Marine Branch (CAMB) and Puerto Rico Police Joint Forces of Rapid Action positioned marine units that were also ready to respond. "Richard Dixon" arrived on scene and interdicted the go-fast, detained the suspected smugglers, a U.S. citizen from Puerto Rico and a national of the Dominican Republic and seized multiple bales of contraband, which tested positive for cocaine. Two smugglers, 491.5 kilograms of cocaine and 9.2 kilograms of heroin worth an estimated wholesale value of 13.3 million were held.

On August 9, 2018, Richard Dixon intercepted two yola type vessels from the Dominican Republic carrying a total of 56 refugees. One of the refugees was brought ashore by Puerto Rico Police Joint Forces of Rapid Action while the rest were safely repatriated in the Dominican Republic.

On December 24, 2018, Richard Dixon intercepted a suspected vessel. She arrived on scene and interdicted the go-fast, detained the suspected smugglers, four citizens of the Dominican Republic and seized multiple bales of contraband, which tested positive for cocaine. 210 kilograms of cocaine were seized worth an estimated wholesale value of 5 million dollars.

On May 13, 2019, Richard Dixon intercepted a yola type vessel from the Dominican Republic carrying a total of 20 refugees. Four of the refugees were brought ashore by Customs and Border Protection while the rest were safely repatriated in the Dominican Republic.

Namesake
The vessel is named after Richard Dixon, a Coast Guard hero.

References

Sentinel-class cutters
Cutters
2015 ships
Ships built in Lockport, Louisiana
Ships of the United States Coast Guard